Ilipa is an ancient Spanish town near Seville. It is famous as the site of the Battle of Ilipa.

Municipalities of the Province of Seville